Louis Giambalvo (born February 8, 1945) is an American actor, frequently seen on television in guest roles.

Early life and education
Giambalvo was born and raised in the Sunset Park neighborhood of Brooklyn, New York City, where he attended Catholic school. He received a Bachelor of Fine Arts and MFA from Harpur College (now Binghamton University) and was a founding member of the avant-garde Colonnades Theater Lab in Greenwich Village, along with other members Danny DeVito and Peter Scolari. In 1979, Giambalvo moved to Los Angeles, California to begin his film and television career.

Career
His television credits include: Barney Miller, Hart to Hart, St. Elsewhere, Hill Street Blues, The Love Boat, Remington Steele, The A-Team, Simon & Simon, Fame, Knots Landing, Murder, She Wrote, Star Trek: Voyager, Brooklyn South, Ally McBeal, ER, NYPD Blue (Mr. Bucci), Boston Legal, Without a Trace, CSI, Ugly Betty, Dirty Sexy Money and Raising the Bar. He also played Al Capone on the NBC series The Gangster Chronicles. He also was in the award-winning television movie Gia, starring Angelina Jolie, playing the role of Gia Carangi's father Joseph.

Giambalvo's feature films include "Bottle Shock", "Gun Shy", "Hoffa", and the 1983 horror/science fiction film Nightmares. He is best known for his roles in such films as Airplane II: The Sequel (1982), the 1985 comedy film Real Genius as a CIA man, Major Carnagle, Jagged Edge (1985) as Mr. Fabrizzi, the 1988 film The Dead Pool as Gus Wheeler, and the 1989 film Weekend at Bernie's as Vito.

Selected filmography
 1980 Escape (TV Movie) as Hank
 1980 Reward (TV Movie) as "Dutch"
 1980 Alcatraz: The Whole Shocking Story (TV Movie) as Clarence Anglin
 1981 Fly Away Home (TV Movie) as Vogel
 1981 Gangster Wars as Al Capone
 1982 The Ambush Murders (TV Movie) as Glenn Landis
 1982 Marian Rose White (TV Movie) as Eddy White
 1982 Mae West (TV Movie) as George Kane
 1982 Airplane II: The Sequel as Witness
 1983 Hart to Hart as Lt. Davern
 1983 Second Thoughts as Sergeant Cabrillo
 1983 Nightmares as Jerry Cooney (segment "The Bishop of Battle")
 1983 Deal of the Century as Freddie Muntz
 1984 The Ratings Game (TV Movie) as "Goody" DeSalvo
 1985 Dirty Work (TV Movie) as George Wylie
 1985 Real Genius as Major Don Carnagle
 1985 Jagged Edge as Fabrizi
 1988 Bad Dreams as Ed
 1988 Kansas as Army Sergeant
 1988 The Dead Pool as Gus Wheeler
 1988 Liberace: Behind the Music (TV Movie) as Eddie
 1988 Leap of Faith (TV Movie) as Dr. Santini
 1988 Crossing the Mob (TV Movie)
 1989 Anything But Love (TV Series) as Norman Kiel 
 1989 See No Evil, Hear No Evil as Lieutenant Gatlin
 1989 Weekend at Bernie's as Vito
 1990 The Bonfire of the Vanities as Ray Andruitti
 1992 Till Death Do Us Part (TV Movie) as Charles Kerwin
 1992 Those Secrets (TV Movie) as Kobe
 1992 Mastergate (TV Movie) as Lance Boil
 1992 Hoffa as RTA Representative
 1993 Fade to Black (TV Movie)
 1993 Donato and Daughter (TV Movie) as Chief Hugh Halliday
 1994 Flashfire as Al Sherwin
 1994 Moment of Truth: Murder or Memory? (TV Movie) as Lou Panetta
 1995 Illegal in Blue as Lieutenant Cavanaugh
 1997 Always Say Goodbye as Deli Man
 1998 Gia (TV Movie) as Joe Carangi
 2000 Gun Shy as DEA Agent Lonny Burke
 2000 The Lost Child (TV Movie) as Karl
 2002 Death to Smoochy as Sonny Gordon
 2003 Duplex as The Pharmacist
 2008 Bottle Shock as George Taber

References

External links
 
 
 Louis Giambalvo at Filmbug.com

1945 births
American people of Italian descent
American male film actors
American male television actors
Living people
Male actors from New York City
Harpur College alumni
20th-century American male actors
21st-century American male actors
People from Sunset Park, Brooklyn